The borate carbonates are mixed anion compounds containing both borate and carbonate ions. Compared to mixed anion compounds containing halides, these are quite rare. They are hard to make, requiring higher temperatures, which are likely to decompose carbonate to carbon dioxide. The reason for the difficulty of formation is that when entering a crystal lattice, the anions have to be correctly located, and correctly oriented. They are also known as borocarbonates. Although these compounds have been termed carboborate, that word also refers to the C=B=C5− anion, or CB11H12− anion. This last anion should be called 1-carba-closo-dodecaborate or monocarba-closo-dodecaborate.

Some borate carbonates have additional different anions and can be borate carbonate halides or borate carbonate nitrites.

List

References

Borates
Carbonates
Mixed anion compounds